Luz Fabiola Rueda married Oppliger (born 26 March 1963) is a former Colombian mountain runner who won two World Mountain Running Championships (1987, 1988).

References

External links

 
 Fabiola Rueda at Association of Road Racing Statisticians

1963 births
Living people
Place of birth missing (living people)
Colombian mountain runners
Colombian female middle-distance runners
Colombian female long-distance runners
World Mountain Running Championships winners
Central American and Caribbean Games medalists in athletics
Central American and Caribbean Games gold medalists for Colombia
Competitors at the 1986 Central American and Caribbean Games
20th-century Colombian women